Yangon is administered by the Yangon City Development Committee (YCDC). YCDC also coordinates urban planning. The city is divided into four districts. Yangon Region is divided into four districts, which overlap with the city's jurisdiction. The current mayor of Yangon is U Bo Htay , an economist and a retired professor at the Yangon Institute of Economics. Each township is administered by a committee of township leaders, who make decisions regarding city beautification and infrastructure. Myo-thit (lit. "New Towns", or satellite towns) are not within such jurisdictions.

Yangon is a member of Asian Network of Major Cities 21.

References

Yangon-related lists